A bandwidth-sharing game is a type of resource allocation game designed to model the real-world allocation of bandwidth to many users in a network. The game is popular in game theory because the conclusions can be applied to real-life networks.

The game 
The game involves  players.
Each player  has utility  for  units of bandwidth.

Regarding , we assume
 
  is increasing and concave;
  is continuous.

The game arises from trying to find a price  so that every player individually optimizes their own welfare. This implies every player must individually find . Solving for the maximum yields .

Problem 
With this maximum condition, the game then becomes a matter of finding a price that satisfies an equilibrium. Such a price is called a market clearing price.

Possible solution 

A popular idea to find the price is a method called fair sharing. The resource is then distributed in  amounts by the formula . This method yields an effective price .
This price can proven to be market clearing; thus, the distribution  is optimal. The proof is as so:

Proof 
We have

.
Hence,

from which we conclude 
  
and thus

Comparing this result to the equilibrium condition above, we see that when  is very small, the two conditions equal each other and thus, the fair sharing game is almost optimal.

References

Game theory